The 2005 NCAA Division I baseball tournament was held from May 30 through June 26, . Sixty-four NCAA Division I college baseball teams met after having played their way through a regular season, and for some, a conference tournament, to play in the NCAA tournament.  The tournament culminated with 8 teams in the College World Series at historic Rosenblatt Stadium in Omaha, Nebraska.

A major format change for the regionals began in 2005. Rather than play both games of the championship round on the third day (usually Sunday) of the tournament, the "if necessary" championship game would be played on the fourth day of the tournament (usually Monday), allowing a team in the loser's bracket to rest some of its pitchers for a winner-take-all contest.

The home-state Nebraska Cornhuskers won their first College World Series game after going winless in their previous two appearances.

Texas went undefeated in the College World Series, earning its spot in the championship series with a walk-off home run against Big 12 Conference rival Baylor, before sweeping Florida in the championship series.

Bids

Automatic bids
Conference champions from 30 Division I conferences earned automatic bids to regionals.  The remaining 34 spots were awarded to schools as at-large invitees.

Bids by conference

Tournament notes 
 North Carolina A&T, Quinnipiac and Rhode Island were making their first NCAA tournament appearance.

CWS records tied or broken
Total attendance: 263,475 (previous record was 260,091 in 2003)
Average single session attendance: 23,952
No game was decided by more than five runs, making the 2005 CWS the closest-contended in history
For the first time in CWS history, not a single player hit a triple
Texas closer J. B. Cox tied the CWS record with five pitching appearances

National seeds 
Bold indicates CWS participant.

Nebraska
Baylor

Florida
Oregon State

Regionals and super regionals

Bold indicates winner.

New Orleans Super Regional

Atlanta Super Regional

Lincoln Super Regional

Waco Super Regional

Oxford Super Regional

Fullerton Super Regional

Gainesville Super Regional

Corvallis Super Regional

College World Series

Participants

Bracket

National championship series

Game 1 – Texas 4, Florida 2

Game 2 – Texas 6, Florida 2

All-Tournament Team

The following players were members of the College World Series All-Tournament Team.

References

NCAA Division I Baseball Championship
 
Baseball in Austin, Texas
Baseball in Waco, Texas